Tammisha (also spelled Tamisha or Tammishe) was a medieval city in Tabaristan (north of Iran) on the foot of the Alborz mountain, serving as a place of high importance, often being the residence of princes. The city bordered the region of Gurgan, and featured a prominent wall, the Tammisha Wall, built in the Sasanian period.

References

Sources 
 
 

Sasanian cities